Jacob "Jaap" Oudkerk (born 2 August 1937) is a retired cyclist from the Netherlands. He competed in the 4000 m team pursuit at the 1960 and 1964 Summer Olympics and finished in fifth and third place, respectively.

He was also active in motor-paced racing. After winning the world championships in the amateurs category in 1964 he turned professional and won three more world championship medals, including a gold in 1969.

He was the husband of Marianne Heemskerk, a Dutch Olympic swimmer.

See also
 List of Dutch Olympic cyclists

References

1937 births
Living people
Dutch male cyclists
Olympic cyclists of the Netherlands
Cyclists at the 1960 Summer Olympics
Cyclists at the 1964 Summer Olympics
Olympic bronze medalists for the Netherlands
Olympic medalists in cycling
People from Landsmeer
Medalists at the 1964 Summer Olympics
UCI Track Cycling World Champions (men)
Cyclists from North Holland
Dutch track cyclists
20th-century Dutch people
21st-century Dutch people